Below is a list of notable people born in Berovo, North Macedonia or its surroundings.
  Gavril Atanasov, icon painter
  Nikica Klinčarski, football player
   Ilyo Voyvoda (1822 - 1898), revolutionary

Berovo
List